Partit Renovador d'Arties e Garòs (PRAG) is a political party in the terçon of Arties e Garòs, Aran Valley (Catalonia, Spain).

The party is associated with Unity of Aran (UA), which is not present in the terçon of Arties e Garòs. Its Secretary General is José Antonio Bruna Vilanova.

Electoral performance

General Council of Aran

References

Political parties in Val d'Aran